Clubiona decora is a sac spider species found on Madeira, the Azores and the Balkans.

See also 
 List of Clubionidae species

References

External links 

Clubionidae
Spiders of Europe
Arthropods of Madeira
Arthropods of the Azores
Fauna of the Balkans
Spiders described in 1859